Flotsam Jetsam were an Australian synth pop band active from 1983 to 1988. 

The group released two singles and one EP which peaked inside the Australian top 100 charts. Their single "Show Me" was engineered by Guy Gray and it earned him a nomination for the 1987 ARIA Music Award for Engineer of the Year.

The band supported A-ha, Queen and Simply Red on Australian tours.

Members
Stephen Ferris (vocals)
Nick Ferris (bass, drum programming)
Tony Gilbert (guitar)
John Swanton (percussion)
Michael Iacano (keyboards)
Ashley Cadell (keyboards)
Peter Ciabo (drums)

Discography

EP

Singles

References

Australian pop music groups
Musical groups established in 1983
Musical groups disestablished in 1988
New South Wales musical groups